Jazz is the second extended play by American comedy rock band Tenacious D. Released in 2012, the EP consists of a single eleven-minute jazz composition with vocals. The EP was released as a digital download and a limited edition vinyl record.

Background 
In October 2012, Jack Black announced that Tenacious D would record a jazz album, saying that it would "contain lyrics, but still channel Thelonious Monk, Miles Davis and other instrument-based jazz influences." In 2014, Jack Black recalled that he played the recording for jazz double bass player Charlie Haden and Haden walked out of the room shortly after it began.

Content 

The first side of the record was an eleven-minute jazz composition with comedic vocals by Jack Black. Kyle Gass played the recorder, rather than guitar. Jack Black makes reference to the band's film The Pick of Destiny when he sings, "Who put Beelzeboss into my jazz?"  There is also an interpolation of Disturbed's song "Down with the Sickness", with Brooks Wackerman performing the opening drum notes from Disturbed's song and Jack Black imitating singer David Draiman's vocal intro to that song. The second side of the record contained a short skit, which was left off the iTunes release of the album.

Release
In October 2012, Tenacious D performed "Simply Jazz" live in concert prior to the EP's release. On November 5, Tenacious D appeared on The Late Late Show With Craig Ferguson, performing "Simply Jazz" in promotion of the EP. The EP was released as a limited edition vinyl record as part of a Record Store Day promotion at participating stores. It is available as a digital EP on iTunes, which includes a bonus video, "The Making of Simply Jazz". The limited edition vinyl record contained a download card for the "making of" video.

Track listing

Personnel
John Spiker - bass, jazz
Brooks Wackerman - drums, jazz
John Konesky - guitar, jazz
Kyle Gass - recorder, jazz
Jack Black - vocals, jazz

References

External links
 Discogs

2012 EPs
Jazz EPs
Tenacious D albums
Columbia Records EPs
Jazz albums by American artists
Albums recorded at Electro-Vox Recording Studios